Alapadna pauropis, the variable spot-wing, is a species of moth of the family Noctuidae first described by Turner in 1902. It is found in the Australian states of Queensland, New South Wales, Victoria and Tasmania.

Adults are brown with a variable pattern of dark lines and spots.

References

Moths described in 1902
Catocalinae
Moths of Australia